Ban Pao may refer to:

 Ban Pao, Mae Taeng, Chiang Mai
Ban Pao, Lampang